Jonathan James Benjamin Lewis (born 21 May 1970, Isleworth, Middlesex, England) is the current Batting Coach of Bangladesh. 

He represented Essex (1990-1996; Cap 1995) and Durham (1997-2006, Captain 2001-2004) as a right-handed batsman and occasional right-arm medium fast bowler in 205 first-class matches. He scored 10,281 runs at an average of 31.92 with a highest score of 210. He scored 16 hundreds and 66 fifties.

He attended King Edward VI Grammar School, Chelmsford, Essex.

Coaching
Lewis was appointed second team coach by Durham County Cricket Club. In June 2013 first team coach Geoff Cook suffered a heart attack and Lewis deputised, helping Durham to their third County Championship title win (Cook survived). Lewis was appointed first team coach on a full-time basis in December 2013.

References

External links
 Cricinfo
 Cricket Archive

1970 births
Durham cricket captains
Durham cricketers
English cricket coaches
English cricketers
Essex cricketers
Living people
People educated at King Edward VI Grammar School, Chelmsford
People from Isleworth
First-Class Counties Select XI cricketers